Gökçebayır is a village in the Ezine District of Çanakkale Province in Turkey. Its population is 688 (2021).

References

Villages in Ezine District